Ferhat Öztorun  (born 8 May 1987) is a Turkish professional footballer who plays as a defender for Pendikspor.

Club career
After playing several years for Galatasaray's youth teams, Öztorun was promoted to first team squad for the 2005–06 season. After Orhan Ak and Ergün Penbe, who were the squad's experienced left backs, experienced injuries, Öztorun made his debut in a league match between Konyaspor and Galatasaray in Konya on 22 January 2006. Following his debut, he filled a squad-rotation role at the club.

Öztorun was transferred to Vestel Manisaspor on 3 September 2007.

Honours
Trabzonspor
Turkish Super Cup: 2010

Konyaspor
Turkish Super Cup: 2017

References

External links
 
 Guardian's Stats Centre
 

1987 births
People from Şişli
Footballers from Istanbul
Living people
Turkish footballers
Turkey under-21 international footballers
Turkey B international footballers
Association football fullbacks
Association football defenders
Galatasaray S.K. footballers
Manisaspor footballers
Trabzonspor footballers
Orduspor footballers
İstanbul Başakşehir F.K. players
Konyaspor footballers
Tuzlaspor players
Pendikspor footballers
Süper Lig players
TFF First League players